Remember Me is a 2002 album by Hyphy Bay Area rapper Mac Dre.

Track listing
 "Another Dose" - (Intro)
 "Livin' That Life" - (Remix)
 "Gift 2 Gab"
 "How I Got This Name" - (Remix)
 "Should of Been Mo"' - (Remix)
 "My Folks"
 "Who Can It Be" - (Remix)
 "Back 2 My Mission" - (Remix)
 "Times R Gettin' Crazy" - (Remix)
 "Feelin Like That Nigga"
 "California Livin'" - (Remix)

2002 albums
Mac Dre albums